An Yan Lim Lim Kee Chong (born May 15, 1960) is a retired Mauritian association football referee. He is mostly known for supervising two matches in the FIFA World Cup - a Group B first-round match between Brazil and Russia in 1994 and a Group G first-round match between Romania and Colombia in 1998. He was suspended following the 1998 World Cup.

In addition, Lim Kee Chong served as a referee for African Cup of Nations tournaments in 1992, 1994 (including the final match), 1996, 1998, and 2002. His other international events include the 1991 FIFA U-17 World Championship, the 1992 Olympic tournament, and the 1992 and 1995 King Fahd Cup tournaments. He officiated in qualifying matches for the 1994, 1998, 2002, and 2006 World Cups.

A customs officer during his career as a match official, he has since worked as referee coordinator for the Mauritius Football Association and a refereeing instructor for FIFA's development projects in Africa.

References

1960 births
Living people
Mauritian people of Chinese descent
Mauritian football referees
FIFA World Cup referees
1998 FIFA World Cup referees
1994 FIFA World Cup referees
Olympic football referees